The Skansen Tunnel is an immersed tube underwater tunnel in the city of Trondheim in Sør-Trøndelag county, Norway. Part of Norwegian National Road 706, it runs from Brattøra to Ila.

References

External links

Road tunnels in Trøndelag
Subsea tunnels in Norway
Tunnels completed in 2010
Norwegian National Road 706